Padre Bernardo is a municipality located in the state of Goiás, Brazil.

Location
Padre Bernardo is located 42 km north of the boundary with the Federal District.  It has boundaries with the following municipalities: 
North: Mimoso de Goiás 
South: Cocalzinho de Goiás
East: Planaltina de Goiás    
West:  Vila Propício

The Economy
The main economic activities are cattle raising and growing of corn and soybeans.  Local commerce, with restaurants, bars, clothing and shoe shops, banks, supermarkets, among others, supply the basic necessities of the population.  There are small industries of brick making, milk produces and clothing manufacturing.  The largest employer in the town was the government.  There were 02 bank branches in August 2007.

In 2006 there were 137,000 head of cattle.  The main agricultural products were rice, bananas, sugarcane, beans, coconuts, oranges, lemons, manioc, corn, and soybeans (11,000 hectares in 2006).  Seplan

Agricultural data 2006
Farms:  1,113
Total area:  198,109 ha.
Area of permanent crops: 1,462 ha.
Area of perennial crops: 31,490 ha.
Area of natural pasture:  124,040 ha. 
Area of woodland and forests:  35,582 ha. 
Persons dependent on farming:  3,400
Number of tractors:  318
Cattle herd:  137,000  IBGE

Health and Education
In 2006 there were 26 schools with 8,495 students enrolled.  The literacy rate was 82.6% in 2000.  In 2007 there was 01 hospital with 27 beds.  The infant mortality rate was 30.06% in 2000. The Municipal Human Development Index rating was 0.705 in 2000. Seplan
State ranking:  204 (out of 242 municipalities)
National ranking:  2,909 (out of 5,507 municipalities) For the complete list see Frigoletto.com

See also
List of municipalities in Goiás

References
https://cidades.ibge.gov.br/brasil/go/padre-bernardo/panorama

https://www.padrebernardo.go.gov.br/

Frigoletto
Distâncias Rodoviárias

Municipalities in Goiás